Chippington is a surname. Notable people with the surname include: 

Jeanette Chippington (born 1970), British Paralympic swimmer and paracanoeist
Ted Chippington (born 1962), British stand-up comedian